West Coast Resurrection is an independently released compilation album by American rapper The Game. It was released on March 29, 2005, via Get Low Recordz. It was produced by JT the Bigga Figga, Sean T, and G-Man Stan.

The album was more successful than his previous independent release, Untold Story, peaking at #53 on the Billboard 200, #24 on the Top R&B/Hip-Hop Albums, #2 on the Independent Albums, and #53 on the Billboard Comprehensive Albums charts.

Critical reception
Entertainment Weekly praised "Promised Land," writing: "Built on an exquisitely soulful boom-bap beat, the song is an engaging sneak peek at an MC honing his nascent rhyme skills." Vibe called the album "a gritty look back at a rapper's first grasp at stardom."

Track listing

References

2005 albums
The Game (rapper) albums